The P'yŏngdŏk Line is an electrified standard-gauge trunk line of the Korean State Railway in North Korea running from Taedonggang Station in P'yŏngyang, where it connects to the P'yŏngbu, P'yŏngnam, P'yŏngra and P'yŏngŭi Lines, to Kujang, where it connects to the Manp'o and Ch'ŏngnyŏn P'arwŏn Lines.

Description
The P'yŏngdŏk Line is currently under the jurisdiction of the P'yŏngyang Railway Bureau (Taedonggang–Hyangwŏn section), and of the Kaech'ŏn Railway Bureau (Tuillyŏng–Kujang section). Economically, it is a very important line, connecting P'yŏngyang with the coal mining and industrial centres of Pukch'ang, Tŏkch'ŏn and the South and North P'yŏngan provinces.

Numerous secondary lines connect to the P'yŏngdŏk Line, including those to Ryŏngdae, Myŏnghak, Sŏch'ang and Changsang. Many of these branchlines are to coal mines that send coal to the Pukch'ang Thermal Power Complex, and to other industrial centres and power plants.

There are 38 stations on the line, not including Taedonggang (which "belongs" to the P'yŏngbu Line), Sinsŏngch'ŏn (P'yŏngra Line) and Kujang Ch'ŏngnyŏn (Manp'o Line). Of these, 33 are regular intermediate stations. There is also a freight station at Mirim, one halt, and three signal stations. Passing through mountainous territory, the P'yŏngdŏk Line thus features many bridges and tunnels.

History 

The P'yŏngdŏk Line was formed by the Korean State Railway by merging the P'yŏngyang Colliery Line, the Sŏsŏn Line, and the Tŏkpal Line.

P'yŏngyang Colliery Line 
The P'yŏngyang Colliery Line was opened by the Chosen Government Railway (Sentetsu) in two parts to exploit the rich anthracite deposits of the area. The first section,  from P'yŏngyang to Sadong, was opened on 1 September 1911. Seven years later, on 5 May 1918 a  extension from Sadong to Sŭnghori was opened. The stations at Taedonggang and Sadong were opened in 1911, while the stations at Mirim and Sŭngho-ri were opened in 1918, and the station at Sŏn'gyori on 15 October 1920. Sentetsu then opened the station at Ch'ŏngryong and the Myŏngdang Line on 1 November 1925, followed by the station at Ripsŏngri and the Kobi Line on 1 November 1934.

In 1919, the line was opened to passenger traffic, with two return trips operating between P'yŏngyang and Sŭnghori daily; these trains ran with third-class cars only, and a ticket for the full distance cost 40 sen in 1920.

Sŏsŏn Line 
The privately owned West Chosen Central Railway opened its mainline, called the Sŏsŏn Line ("West Chosen Line") from Sŭnghori to Chang'an (now Namdŏk) in several stages between 1939 and 1945. The first section,  from Sŭnghori to Sŏngrŭm, was opened on 29 June 1939, followed five months later by an  extension to P'yŏngnam Kangdong (now just Kangdong).

On 1 October 1941 the West Chosen Central Railway opened a second section of the Sŏsŏn Line, isolated from the first, made up of a  mainline running from Sinsŏngch'ŏn to Pukch'ang and a  branchline from Kujŏng to Chaedong (the Chaedong Line). The newly built line did not long remain part of the West Chosen railway, as on 1 April 1944 the line from Sŭngho-ri all the way to Sinsŏngch'ŏn was transferred to Sentetsu and incorporated into the P'yŏngyang Colliery Line.

The West Chosen Central Railway nevertheless continued expanding its truncated mainline, receiving approval from the Railway Bureau on 21 June 1940 to extend its line to Tŏkch'ŏn and thence onwards to the Changsang coal fields, in order to transport coal from the mines in the area opened in 1938 by the Chosen Anthracite Company. The first of these extensions was a  stretch from Pukch'ang to Okch'ŏn opened on 28 December 1944, which was followed by a second extension,  to Chang'an, opened on 25 May 1945. Tokch'ŏn was reached a few months later.

Tŏkp'al Line 

The plan was to continue from Tŏkch'ŏn via Changsangri to Kujang, where it would link up with Sentetsu's Manp'o Line, and on to P'arwŏn, but construction of this line - called the Tŏkp'al Line - was finished only as far as Changsangri by the end of the Pacific War. The terrain beyond Changsangri proved too difficult to work through, necessitating a new route to Kujang. After adding a new station at Hyangjang,  from Hyangwŏn towards Changsangri, construction on what became the current alignment of the line to Kujang began. However, this wasn't completed before war's end; it was only in 1954 after the end of the Korean War that the connection to P'arwŏn (the line's name came from the two termini, Tŏkch'ŏn and P'alwŏn) via Kujang was finally made.

P'yŏngdŏk Line 
After the end of the Pacific War and subsequent partition of Korea, both the West Chosen Central Railway and the parts of Sentetsu within the newly established DPRK were nationalised, becoming part of the Korean State Railway. The P'yŏngyang Colliery Line (P'yŏngyang–Sinsŏngch'ŏn) and the Sŏsŏn Line (Sinsŏngch'ŏn–Tŏkch'ŏn) were merged to form the P'yŏngdŏk Line (the name coming from the two termini, P'yŏngyang and Tŏkch'ŏn); after the Tŏkp'al Line was extended to Kujang after the end of the Korean War, the Hyangjang–Kujang was later merged with the P'yŏngdŏk Line (the Kujang–P'arwŏn section became part of the Ch'ŏngnyŏn P'arwon Line, but the line's name was not changed. Also, the section from Taedonggang to Mirim was subsequently realigned after the end of the Korean War, during which the line was heavily damaged. The new alignment was about  longer than the old section. Electrification of the line was completed in June 1979.

Modernisation 
On 21 October 2014 a groundbreaking ceremony for the Sŭngri ("Victory") project to modernise the P'yŏngnam Line from Namp'o to P'yŏngyang and the P'yŏngdŏk Line from P'yŏngyang to Chedong was held. The overall project cost is estimated to be around US $25 billion, and it is expected that exports of coal, rare-earth and non-ferrous metals from the DPRK to Russia will provide the funding for the project.

Services

Freight

On the P'yŏngdŏk Line, freight traffic is vastly greater in the southbound direction than northbound - 3.5-8 times greater on the Taedonggang–Sinsŏngch'ŏn section and 6-15.3 times greater on the Sinsŏngch'ŏn–Tŏkch'ŏn–Kujang section. The bulk of the southbound freight traffic is anthracite from the coal fields of North and South P'yŏngan provinces, accounting for anywhere from 55.4% to 99.2% of southbound freight. However, it also accounts for 35.4% of northbound freight on the Sinsŏngch'ŏn–Pukch'ang section, as some of the anthracite extracted at the Ryŏngdae, Chaedong and Solgol mines are shipped to the Pukch'ang Thermal Power Complex - the largest in the DPRK - for fuel.

Cement, ore, stone, fertiliser, wood and metals make up the largest part of northbound cargo. Between Taedonggang and Sinsŏngch'ŏn it is mostly cement, ore, grain, fertilisers and metals, whilst on the Sinsŏngch'ŏn–Tŏkch'ŏn–Kujang section it is primarily wood, cement and fertiliser.

Cement is shipped from the Sŭngho-ri Cement Factory at Sŭnghori. Steel and metals from the Ch'ŏllima Steel Complex on the P'yŏngnam Line and from the Hwanghae Iron & Steel Complex at Changch'ŏlli on the Songrim Line are shipped via the P'yŏngdŏk Line to various factories along the line, including the Sŭngri Motor Plant at Tŏkch'ŏn.

The freight-only station at Mirim is responsible for handling freight for the Taedonggang-guyŏk, Taesong-guyŏk and Sadong-guyŏk districts of P'yŏngyang. The main commodities arriving there are anthracite from Namdŏk, Hŭngryŏng and elsewhere, and cement from Sŭnghori.

The freight yard at Kangdong station handles freight for Kangdong and Hoech'ang counties, and for P'yŏngyang's Samsŏk-kuyŏk district. The main commodities arriving there are fertiliser, steel and cement. Cement arrives from the Sŭnghori Cement Factory, from the 2.8 Cement Complex at West Pongsan on the Pongsan Line, and from Taegŏn on the Taegŏn Line. Steel is from the Hwanghae Iron & Steel Works on the Songrim Line, while fertiliser comes from the Namhŭng Youth Chemical Complex at Namhŭng on the Namhŭng Line, from Hŭngnam and Chisu on the P'yŏngra Line, and from Namp'o. The main commodities shipped from Kangdong are chrysotile asbestos and thread.

The main commodities arriving at Sŏngch'ŏn freight yard are anthracite and fertiliser. Anthracite is shipped here from Sŏch'ang, Namdŏk, Chaedong and Ryŏngdae; fertiliser comes from Hŭngnam and Namhŭng. The main shipments from Sŏngch'ŏn are non-ferrous metal ores, sand, tobacco, metal and logs. The ores and logs are shipped to Munch'ŏn and Haeju, while the sand and tobacco is shipped to P'yŏngyang.

Sŭnghori and Pukch'ŏn are important stations on the P'yŏngdŏk Line. Arriving freight at Sŭnghori is mostly destined for the Sŭnghori Cement Factory, including coal from Hŭngryong, marble from P'yŏngsan on the P'yŏngbu Line and gypsum from Sujin on the Tŏkhyŏn Line. Although most of the cement produced there is sent to P'yŏngyang, a portion is sent to places along the P'yŏngdŏk Line such as Kangdong, Sŏngch'ŏn, Pukch'ang and Tŏkch'ŏn. At Pukch'ŏn the main customer is the massive Pukch'ŏn Thermal Power Complex, receiving tens of thousands of tons coal daily from Okch'ŏn, Ryongsan and Sŏksan on the Soksan Line, Myŏnghak, Solgol, Chenam, Hoe'an, Sŏch'ang, Hyangwŏn, Changsang and Tŏngnam. In addition, Pukch'ang has a large aluminium plant, a soybean-processing plant and a machinery factory.

Passenger

The following passenger trains are known to operate on this line:

 Semi-express trains 117/118, operating between Taedonggang and P'yŏnggang, run on this line between Taedonggang and Sinsŏngch'ŏn;
 Semi-express trains 138-139/140-141, operating between Manp'o Ch'ŏngnyŏn and Changyŏn, run on this line between Kujang and Taedonggang;
 Regional trains 226-227/228-229, operating between Tŏkch'ŏn and P'yŏngnam Onch'ŏn, run on this line between Tŏkch'ŏn and P'yŏngyang;
 Regional trains 231/232 operate between Taedonggang and T'ŏkch'ŏn;
 Regional trains 236-237/238-239, operating between Sariwŏn Ch'ŏngnyŏn and T'ŏkch'ŏn, run on this line between Taedonggang and Tŏkch'ŏn;
 Local trains 302-303/304-305, operating between Sunan and Kangdong, run on this line between P'yŏngyang and Kangdong;
 Local trains 702/703 and 704/705, operate between East P'yŏngyang and Myŏngdang;
 Local trains 723/724 operate between Tŏkch'ŏn and Hyŏngbong;
 Local trains 781/782 operate between Tŏkch'ŏn and Kujang.

Route 
A yellow background in the "Distance" box indicates that section of the line is not electrified.

References

Railway lines in North Korea
Standard gauge railways in North Korea